Carabus principalis is a species of ground beetle from the family Carabidae. They are green coloured with brown pronotum. They are known to reside in China, within the provinces of Zhejiang, Hubei and Hunan.

References

principalis
Beetles described in 1889